Wolf von Lojewski (born 4 July 1937) is a German journalist.

Life 
Lojewski was born in Berlin and studied German law. Later he worked as a journalist for German public broadcasters NDR, ARD and ZDF. 
From  1 March 1992 until 2 January 2003 he presented the heute-journal on ZDF.
Lojewski has written several books on his life as a journalist.

Works 

 1991: Amerika: Ein Traum vom neuen Leben
 2001: Live dabei. Erinnerungen eines Journalisten
 2006: Der schöne Schein der Wahrheit. Politiker, Journalisten und der Umgang mit den Medien

Awards 

 1983 – Goldener Gong for Rund um Big Ben
 1994 – Goldene Kamera
 1995 – Telestar Best moderation documentation/news for heute-journal
 1999 – Hanns Joachim Friedrichs Award
 2003 – Carl Zuckmayer Medal
 2008 – Bayerischer Fernsehpreis for Meine Heimat - Deine Heimat

External links 

 

Journalists from Berlin
German male journalists
German television reporters and correspondents
German broadcast news analysts
20th-century German journalists
21st-century German journalists
1937 births
Living people
German male writers
ARD (broadcaster) people
ZDF people
Norddeutscher Rundfunk people